Vitaly Mikhaylovich Abalakov ( – 26 May 1986) was a Soviet chemical engineer, mountaineer and inventor.

Brother of Yevgeniy Abalakov, another famous alpinist, he made the first Soviet ascent of Lenin Peak in 1934 and two more ascents of this mountain. In 1936 he also made the ascent of Khan Tengri, where he lost several fingers and part of his foot.

In 1938, he and others from his team were arrested by NKVD and were under investigation until 1940. He was accused of "open public propaganda" of western mountaineering techniques and "diminishing" domestic alpinists' achievements and being a "German spy".

Abalakov is credited with such inventions as camming devices in the 1930s, Abalakov thread (or V-thread) gearless ice climbing anchor, and many other climbing equipment innovations.

Awards 
 Order of Lenin (1957)
 Order of the Badge of Honour (1972)
 Honoured Master of Sports of the USSR (1943)
 Honoured Trainer of the USSR (1961)

See also 
 List of Russian inventors

Bibliography 
  Расстрельное время

References 

Honoured Masters of Sport of the USSR
D. Mendeleev University of Chemical Technology of Russia alumni
Soviet inventors
20th-century scientists
Soviet explorers
Soviet mountain climbers
Russian explorers
Russian mountain climbers
Merited Coaches of the Soviet Union
Spartak athletes
Recipients of the Order of Lenin
Burials at Kuntsevo Cemetery
1906 births
1986 deaths